The Monaco men's national under-16 basketball team is a national basketball team of Monaco, administered by the Fédération Monégasque de Basketball.
It represents the country in men's international under-16 basketball competitions.

The team won a gold medal at the 2012 FIBA Europe Under-16 Championship Division C.

See also
Monaco national basketball team
Monaco men's national under-18 basketball team
Monaco women's national under-16 basketball team

References

External links
Archived records of Monaco team participations

Basketball in Monaco
Men's national under-16 basketball teams
Basketball